Muḥammad Mūsá Shafīq  (1932–1979) was Prime Minister of Afghanistan. He was an Afghan politician and poet. He became Foreign Minister in 1971 and Prime Minister in December 1972. He lost both positions when Mohammed Zahir Shah was overthrown on July 17, 1973. He survived throughout the regime of Mohammed Daoud Khan, but was arrested after the 1978 communist coup d'état and executed along with many other anti-communist politicians in 1979.

Early life
Mohammad Musa Shafiq was born in Kama district, Nangarhar province, Afghanistan in 1932. Son of prominent Afghan politicians, civil servants and religious leader Mawlawi Mohammad Ibraheem Kamavi.

Education
Mohammad Musa Shafiq was graduated from Kabul Arabic Religious High School. He earned his Master's degree from Al-Azhar University in Egypt after which he earned an additional Master's degree from Columbia University in New York, United States of America.

Prime minister

As Prime Minister, Shafiq supported reforms of the largely conservative society of Afghanistan. He also sought closer ties with the United States and promised a crack-down on opium growing and smuggling. Other than that, he was also responsible for solving the then ongoing water dispute with Iran on diplomatic terms. Shafiq was prime Minister for seven months.

Notes

Prime Ministers of Afghanistan
Columbia University alumni
20th-century Afghan poets
Executed prime ministers
1932 births
1979 deaths
Executed Afghan people
20th-century executions by Afghanistan
People from Nangarhar Province
Al-Azhar University alumni
Foreign ministers of Afghanistan
Assassinated heads of government